Tavigliano is a comune (municipality) in the Province of Biella in the Italian region Piedmont, located about  northeast of Turin and about  north of Biella.

Tavigliano borders the following municipalities: Andorno Micca, Bioglio, Callabiana, Pettinengo, Piedicavallo, Rassa, Sagliano Micca,  Veglio.

Demographic evolution

References

Cities and towns in Piedmont